The 2019 Sport Clips Haircuts VFW 200 is a NASCAR Xfinity Series race held on August 31, 2019, at Darlington Raceway in Darlington, South Carolina. Contested over 147 laps on the  egg-shaped oval, it was the 24th race of the 2019 NASCAR Xfinity Series season.

Background

Track

Darlington Raceway is a race track built for NASCAR racing located near Darlington, South Carolina. It is nicknamed "The Lady in Black" and "The Track Too Tough to Tame" by many NASCAR fans and drivers and advertised as "A NASCAR Tradition." It is of a unique, somewhat egg-shaped design, an oval with the ends of very different configurations, a condition which supposedly arose from the proximity of one end of the track to a minnow pond the owner refused to relocate. This situation makes it very challenging for the crews to set up their cars' handling in a way that is effective at both ends.

Entry list
The entry list included semi-retired driver Dale Earnhardt Jr., who decided to participate in the race despite being in a plane accident in mid-August 2019.

Practice

First practice

Final practice

Qualifying

Qualifying results

Race

Summary
Ryan Blaney started on pole and led early, holding off Tyler Reddick. After John Hunter Nemechek spun and caused a caution, Blaney pitted and gave the lead to Reddick, who won Stage 1. After Brandon Brown spun and hit the inside wall, Blaney and Justin Allgaier caught up to Reddick, with Blaney taking the Stage 2 victory. Allgaier and Cole Custer battled Reddick for top positions, while Denny Hamlin (who started at the rear of the field) caught up to the top 5.

Blaney left pit road with Custer and Hamlin behind him. Hamlin got by Custer and then slid past Blaney for the lead with 27 remaining. The final caution occurred with around 15 laps remaining, stacking up the field. Hamlin stayed in the lead while Custer took the second position. The restart happened with 10 laps to go. Hamlin took off and retained the lead, while Custer chased him closely.

On the final lap, Custer got right up to Hamlin's back and dove into turn 3. Custer was unable to make it stick, causing Hamlin to cross the finish line in first place and take the apparent victory. Although Hamlin was later disqualified, which gave Custer the race win despite him not leading a single lap.

Stage Results

Stage One
Laps: 45

Stage Two
Laps: 45

Final Stage Results

Stage Three
Laps: 57

After the race
Denny Hamlin was disqualified and stripped of his race win when his car failed a pair of height requirements, being deemed too low in the left front and too high in the right rear, ultimately giving the race win to runner-up Cole Custer. This was the first disqualification of an Xfinity Series race winner and the fourth overall disqualification in the Xfinity Series this season since the 2019 rules were established.

References

NASCAR races at Darlington Raceway
Sport Clips Haircuts VFW 200
2019 in sports in South Carolina
2019 NASCAR Xfinity Series